Ron Heller may refer to:

Ron Heller (offensive tackle) (born 1962), American football offensive tackle who played in the NFL, 1984–1995
Ron Heller (tight end) (born 1963), American football tight end who played in the NFL, 1987–1992